This is a list of the heads of state of Sierra Leone, from the independence of the Sierra Leone in 1961 to the present day.

From 1961 to 1971 the head of state under the Constitution of 1961 was the Queen of Sierra Leone Elizabeth II, who was also the Queen of the United Kingdom and the other Commonwealth realms. The monarch was represented in Sierra Leone by a governor-general. Sierra Leone became a republic within the Commonwealth under the Constitution of 1971 and the monarch and governor-general were replaced by an ceremonial president, a year later it became an executive presidency.

Monarch (1961–1971)
The succession to the throne was the same as the succession to the British throne.

Governor-general
The governor-general was the representative of the monarch in Sierra Leone and exercised most of the powers of the monarch. The governor-general was appointed for an indefinite term, serving at the pleasure of the monarch. Since Sierra Leone was granted independence by the Sierra Leone Independence Act 1961, rather than being first established as a semi-autonomous dominion and later promoted to independence as defined by the Statute of Westminster 1931, the governor-general was to be always appointed solely on the advice of the Cabinet of Sierra Leone without the involvement of the British government, with the sole exception of Maurice Henry Dorman, the former colonial governor, who served as governor-general temporarily until he was replaced by Henry Josiah Lightfoot Boston. In the event of a vacancy the chief justice would have served as the officer administering the government.

Status

Military rule (1967–1968)

First Republic (1971–1992)
Under the Constitution of 1971, the first constitution of the Republic of Sierra Leone, the president replaced the monarch as ceremonial head of state; a year later the presidency became an executive head of state, The president was elected by Parliament for a four-year term. The 1978 Constitution proclaimed Sierra Leone as a one-party state, the president was elected for a seven-year term and can only serve two terms, then in 1991 a new Constitution was made to end the status as a one-party state, the president now serves a five-year term and can only serve two terms. In the event of a vacancy the vice-president served as acting president.

Status

Military rule (1992–1996)
Valentine Strasser led a coup d'état which overthrew President Momoh and his government, again dissolving all political parties and the Parliament.

Second Republic (1996–1997)
When the civilian government was restored so was the Constitution of 1991 and in the 1996 elections the SLPP won the election for most seats in Parliament and the presidential election. In the event of a vacancy the vice-president served as acting president.

Status

Military rule (1997–1998)
Major Johnny Koroma led a coup d'état which overthrew President Kabbah and his government, dissolving all political parties and the Parliament.

Third Republic (1998–present)
The civilian government was restored, as was the Constitution of 1991 and the members of Parliament and the president. In the event of a vacancy the vice-president served as acting president.

Status

Timeline since 1971

Standards

See also
 Sierra Leone presidents and head of state by tribes

References

External links
 World Statesmen – Sierra Leone
 Rulers.org – Sierra Leone

Government of Sierra Leone
Head

Sierra Leone